Denmark– Ghana relations refers to the current and historical relations between Denmark and Ghana. Denmark has an embassy in Accra and  Ghana has an embassy in Copenhagen. Relations date back to 1660, when Danes settled the Gold Coast. Bilateral relations are described as warm and strong. Denmark has assisted Ghana with development since 1958.

Trade
In 2007, Danish exports to Ghana amounted to 108 million DKK, while Ghanaian export to Denmark amounted to 210 million DKK.

Development assistance
From 1958, Denmark assisted Ghana with development. The development assistance stopped in the end of the 1970s to 1983. Ghana was chosen as a Danish programme country in 1990. Denmark assists Ghana with economic development, peace and stability, health, transport, support to the private sector and the fight against poverty.

See also
Foreign relations of Denmark
Foreign relations of Ghana 
Danish Gold Coast

Further reading

References

 
Ghana
Bilateral relations of Ghana